Nathan Roberts may refer to:

 Nate Roberts (skier) (born 1982), American freestyle skier
 Nathan Roberts (volleyball) (born 1986), Australian volleyball player
 Nathan S. Roberts, namesake of the Judge Nathan S. Roberts House, Canastota, Madison County, New York
 Nathan Roberts, amateur engineer involved in the construction of the Erie Canal during the 19th century
 Nathan Roberts, news reporter and anchor at KCBS-TV and KCAL-TV during the 1970s
 Nathan Roberts, former drummer for The Flaming Lips
 Nathan Roberts, South African model and one of the winners of the 2002 British reality show Model Behaviour
 Nathan Roberts (Home and Away), fictional character on the Australian soap opera Home and Away

See also
Nathan Robertson (born 1977), badminton player